Jake Logan can refer to:
Jake Logan, the main character in Tachyon: The Fringe
Jake Logan, the pen name under which several authors have written Slocum Westerns
Jake Logan (wrestler), an American professional wrestler